Geordie Shore OGs is a British reality television series broadcast on MTV developed as a sequel to Geordie Shore. The series reunites the original cast members, alongside their children, friends, and new faces, and follows their personal and professional lives. It premiered on 14 August 2019. MTV renewed the series for a fourth season which premiered on 13 July 2021.

Production
In May 2019, MTV confirmed a new Geordie Shore spin-off, featuring former cast members. Craig Orr, VP of commissioning and development at MTV International, said: "We're really excited to reunite viewers with some of the most influential and most loved cast members. We can't wait to show how life has changed for this lot since leaving the Geordie house and catch up with them as they continue to navigate their way into adulthood."

The first season premiered on 14 August 2019. It featured Aaron Chalmers, Gaz Beadle, Holly Hagan, and Marnie Simpson. Production took place in Bedfordshire, Leeds, London, Newcastle and Newport.

The second season premiered on 26 February 2020 and focused on Marnie's pregnancies, Gaz's girlfriend, and Aaron's professional career in MMA. Sophie Kasaei, who had a recurring role in the first season, then became a full-time cast member in 2020.

The third season premiered on 28 October 2020. Gaz Beadle and Sophie Kasaei did not return to the show after the previous season. Featured Aaron and Tahlia trying to save their relationship when they welcomed a new baby, Marnie's health issues, and Holly's wedding plans.

In June 2021, the fourth season was announced and premiered on 13 July 2021. It featured Marnie and Casey facilitating their on-off relationship. Sophie also returns to the show as she develops as an entrepreneur. Holly grapples with the ups and downs of her upcoming nuptials due to the coronavirus pandemic, while Aaron and his girlfriend Tahlia face challenges after the troubled birth of her second child.

Cast

Episodes

Series overview

Season 1 (2019)

Season 2 (2020)

Season 3 (2020)

Season 4 (2021)

References 

 
2010s British reality television series
2020s British reality television series
2019 British television series debuts
English-language television shows
MTV reality television series